Stead (pronounced 'sted' as in "instead") is an English surname, and may refer to:

Surnames
 Barry Stead (1939–1980), English cricketer
 C. K. Stead (born 1932), New Zealand writer and critic
 Christina Stead (1902–1983), Australian writer
 Dave Stead (born 1966), British drummer
 David Stead (cricketer) (born 1947), New Zealand cricketer 
 David George Stead (1877–1957), Australian marine biologist, conservationist and writer
 Edgar Stead (1881–1949), New Zealand ornithologist, horticulturist and marksman
 Edwin Stead (1701–1735), Kent cricket patron and team captain
 Eugene A. Stead (1908–2005), American physician
 Gary Stead (born 1972), New Zealand cricketer and cricket coach
 George Christopher Stead (1913–2008), Cambridge professor of philosophy and Christian doctrine
 George Gatonby Stead (1841–1908), New Zealand grain merchant, racehorse owner and breeder, businessman
 Isabelle Stead (born 1979), British film producer, director and philanthropist
 J. H. Stead (c.1826–1886), English stage comedian and singer
 Jon Stead (born 1983), English footballer
 Martin Stead (born 1958), Canadian cricketer
 Ralph Stead (1917–2000), British corporate chairman
 Robert J.C. Stead (1880–1959), Canadian journalist and author
 Ron Stead (1936–2011), Canadian baseball pitcher
 William Force Stead (1884–1967), American diplomat, poet, academic and clergyman
 William H. Stead (1858-1918), American politician and lawyer
 William Thomas Stead (1849–1912), British journalist
 Zita Stead (1904-1986), British medical illustrator

Places
 Reno Stead Airport near Reno, Nevada, United States

See also
 Bedstead
 Homestead (disambiguation)
 Kindred (disambiguation)
 Steed (disambiguation)

English-language surnames